Caltha leptosepala, the white marsh marigold, twinflowered marsh marigold, or broadleaved marsh marigold, is a perennial species of flowering plant in the buttercup family. It is native to western North America from Alaska to New Mexico, where it grows in wet mountain habitats in alpine and subalpine regions. There are two general wild types of this species, one native to the interior and one that grows along the Pacific coast and coastal mountains, but these are not always treated separately.

Description

This is a perennial herb growing a mostly naked stem with leaves located basally. The leaves are up to 13 or 15 centimeters long and may have smooth, wrinkled, or toothed edges. The inflorescence bears one or more flowers. Each flower is 1 to 4 centimeters wide and lacks petals, having instead petallike sepals which are usually white or sometimes yellow. In the center are many long, flat stamens and fewer pistils. Caltha leptosepala grows in moist to wet soils in partial shade. Its native habitats include wet alpine, subalpine meadows, stream edges and bogs.

Taxonomy 
Caltha leptosepala used to be assigned to the Populago (now Caltha) section with all other Northern Hemisphere species. Genetic analysis however suggests that C. leptosepala is the sister of all Southern Hemisphere species and should be moved into the Psychrophila section. 
Caltha leptosepala itself is a complex species that has two distinct subspecies in the southwest and southeast of its range, but in the north of its range the distinguishing sets of characters can be found in any combination, and such plants cannot be assigned to either subspecies.
 ssp. howellii has one or two flowers with oblong-ovate white sepals. The kidney-shaped leaves of up to 15 cm long have an obtuse tip and basal lobes touching or overlapping. Pollen is pantoporate or sometimes pantocolpate (microscope). It grows in open, marshy vegetation in the Sierra Nevada and the Cascade Range in California, western Nevada, Oregon, western Washington, and on Vancouver Island. 
 ssp. leptosepala var. leptosepala has one, exceptionally two flowers with white, linear-oblong sepals. The leaves are ovate heart-shaped, up to 7 cm long, have an obtuse to acuminate tip and basal lobes that do not touch. The pollen is tricolpate. It can be found in open marshy alpine and subalpine places in the Rocky Mountains of northeastern Arizona, Colorado, southeastern Idaho, southern Montana, northeastern Nevada, Utah and Wyoming. 
 ssp. leptosepala var. sulphurea is identical to the nominate variety but has yellow sepals. It occurs in wet alpine and subalpine meadows in the Rocky Mountains of Montana and Idaho.

Edibility 
The leaves are eaten by elk, although they contain toxic alkaloids.

The leaves and flower buds were eaten by some of the indigenous people of Alaska.

References

External links
Edibility of Caltha leptosepala: Visual identification and edible parts of Caltha leptosepala.

leptosepala
Plants described in 1817
Flora of Alaska
Flora of British Columbia
Flora of the Northwestern United States
Flora of the Southwestern United States
Flora without expected TNC conservation status